Unecha, a town and the administrative center of Unechsky District in Bryansk Oblast, Russia, stands on the Unecha River (within the Dnieper's basin)  southwest of Bryansk, the administrative center of the oblast. Population:

History
Town status was granted to it in 1940.

From 1936 to 1951 Unecha was the home station for the Unecha motive branch of the Belarusian railway. 
From September 1943 to March 1944 the Directorate of the Belarusian railway was situated in the town.

Prior to the war, about 12% of inhabitants were Jews. 1,708 Jews were living in Unecha. The town was occupied by the German army in the middle of August 1941. A large number of Jews managed to flee to the east before the Germans’ arrival.
Shortly after the German occupation, the Jews were distinguished and forbidden to leave the town. In October 1941, all the Jews were confined to a closed ghetto, where they stayed until its liquidation in mid-March 1942. Due to harsh living conditions and hunger, many Jews died before the liquidation. Hundred of them were executed and group of Roma from another village were murdered alongside the Jews on this day.

Administrative and municipal status
Within the framework of administrative divisions, Unecha serves as the administrative center of Unechsky District. As an administrative division, it is, together with six rural localities, incorporated within Unechsky District as Unechsky Urban Administrative Okrug. As a municipal division, Unechsky Urban Administrative Okrug is incorporated within Unechsky Municipal District as Unechskoye Urban Settlement.

References

Notes

Sources

Cities and towns in Bryansk Oblast
Mglinsky Uyezd
Holocaust locations in Russia